This is a list of 128 species in the genus Goera, little gray sedges.

Goera species

References